Brahim Darri (born 14 September 1994) is a Dutch footballer who plays as a winger for Qatari club Mesaimeer. Darri was born in the Netherlands to parents of Moroccan descent. Besides the Netherlands, he has played in Turkey.

Club career
Darri made his Eredivisie debut for Vitesse on 13 August 2011 in a 4–0 home win against VVV-Venlo, at just 16 years and 333 days old, being the youngest of the club's history. On 17 November 2011, he signed a professional contract with Vitesse, until 2014.

On 26 September 2012, Darri scored his first professional goal, in a 3–0 away win against VV Gemert, for the season's KNVB Cup. On 18 December, Darri signed a two-year contract extension.

References

External links
 
 Voetbal International profile 
 
 

1994 births
Sportspeople from Amersfoort
Footballers from Utrecht (province)
Dutch sportspeople of Moroccan descent
Living people
Dutch footballers
Netherlands youth international footballers
Netherlands under-21 international footballers
Association football wingers
SBV Vitesse players
De Graafschap players
Heracles Almelo players
NEC Nijmegen players
FC Den Bosch players
Fatih Karagümrük S.K. footballers
Büyükşehir Belediye Erzurumspor footballers
Samsunspor footballers
Denizlispor footballers
Mesaimeer SC players
Eredivisie players
Eerste Divisie players
TFF First League players
Süper Lig players
Dutch expatriate footballers
Expatriate footballers in Turkey
Dutch expatriate sportspeople in Turkey
Expatriate footballers in Qatar
Dutch expatriate sportspeople in Qatar